Pagodidaphne is a small genus of sea snails, marine gastropod mollusks in the family Raphitomidae.

Species
Species within the genus Pagodidaphne include:

 Pagodidaphne colmani Shuto, 1983
 Pagodidaphne schepmani (Thiele, 1925)

References

 Shuto, T. 1983. New turrid taxa from the Australian waters. Memoirs of the Faculty of Sciences of Kyushu University, Series D, Geology 25: 1-26

External links
 
 Worldwide Mollusc Species Data Base: Raphitomidae
 Bouchet, P.; Kantor, Y. I.; Sysoev, A.; Puillandre, N. (2011). A new operational classification of the Conoidea (Gastropoda). Journal of Molluscan Studies. 77(3): 273-308
 MNHN, Paris: image of a shell of Pagodidaphne sp. from the Mozambique Channel

 
Raphitomidae
Gastropod genera